Mabinlins are sweet-tasting proteins extracted from the seed of mabinlang (Capparis masaikai Levl.), a plant growing in Yunnan province of China.  There are four homologues.  Mabinlin-2 was first isolated in 1983 and characterised in 1993, and is the most extensively studied of the four. The other variants of mabinlin-1, -3 and -4 were discovered and characterised in 1994.

Protein structures 
The 4 mabinlins are very similar in their amino acids sequences (see below).

Chain A
M-1: 
M-2: 
M-3: 
M-4: 
Chain B
M-1: 
M-2: 
M-3: 
M-4: 
''Amino acid sequence of Mabinlins homologues are adapted from Swiss-Prot biological database of protein.

The molecular weights of Mabinlin-1, Mabinlin-3 and Mabinlin-4 are 12.3 kDa, 12.3 kDa and 11.9 kDa, respectively.

With a molecular weight of 10.4kDa, mabinlin-2 is lighter than mabinlin-1. It is a heterodimer consisting of two different chains A and B produced by post-translational cleavage. The A chain is composed of 33 amino acid residues and the B chain is composed of 72 amino acid residues. The B chain contains two intramolecular disulfide bonds and is connected to the A chain through two intermolecular disulfide bridges.

Mabinlin-2 is the sweet-tasting protein with the highest known thermostability, which is due to the presence of the four disulfide bridges. It has been suggested also that the difference in the heat stability of the different mabinlin homologues is due to the presence of an arginine residue (heat-stable homologue) or a glutamine (heat-unstable homologue) at position 47 in the B-chain.

The sequences of Mabilins cluster with Napins.

Sweetness properties 
Mabinlins sweetness were estimated to be about 100-400 times that of sucrose on molar basis, 10 times sucrose on a weight basis, which make them less sweet than thaumatin (3000 times) but elicit a similar sweetness profile.

The sweetness of mabinlin-2 is unchanged after 48 hours incubation at 80 °C.

Mabinlin-3 and -4 sweetness stayed unchanged after 1 hour at 80 °C, while mabinlin-1 loses sweetness after 1 hour at the same condition.

As a sweetener 
Mabinlins, as proteins, are readily soluble in water and found to be highly sweet; however, mabinlin-2 with its high heat stability has the best chance to be used as a sweetener.

During the past decade, attempts have been made to produce mabinlin-2 industrially. The sweet-tasting protein has been successfully synthesised by a stepwise solid-phase method in 1998, however the synthetic protein had an astringent-sweet taste.

Mabinlin-2 has been expressed in transgenic potato tubers, but no explicit results have been reported yet.  However, patents to protect production of recombinant mabinlin by cloning and DNA sequencing have been issued.

See also 
Brazzein
Monellin
Pentadin
Thaumatin

References

External links 

Sugar substitutes
Proteins